The Hawdon River is a river of New Zealand. One of the headwaters of Canterbury's Waimakariri River, it flows south through Arthur's Pass National Park, reaching the Waimakariri to the north of the settlement of Cass.

See also
List of rivers of New Zealand

References

Rivers of Canterbury, New Zealand
Rivers of New Zealand